Streethawk: A Seduction is the fourth studio album by Destroyer, recorded in the fall of 2000 and released in 2001. It was recorded at JC/DC Studios and produced by JC/DC.  It was reissued in 2010 on Merge Records (MRG373).

Critical reception

Streethawk: A Seduction received largely positive reviews from music critics. Paul Thompson of Pitchfork gave the album a very positive review, calling it "a record of practically nothing but graceful abandon. Each line seems immaculately crafted, every note falling into perfect order, every word sung with the proper bite and bile. This is what Bejar was building to, why he became a songwriter in the first place, and he reaches quite a precipice. Songs move effortlessly between bits of received wisdom, the drama is amped up to almost unthinkable levels, and these tunes feel like a long series of exclamation points. The guy got really good really fast, and he knew it-- his wit is sharp, his observations are keen, and his gaze is withering."

Track listing

Personnel 
Dan Bejar
John Collins
Scott Morgan 
Stephen Wood
Jason Zumpano

References

External links
 Download the track "Sublimation Hour" from the label's website
Download the track "Virgin With a Memory" from the label's website

2001 albums
Destroyer (band) albums
Albums produced by John Collins (Canadian musician)
Albums produced by David Carswell